The following television stations operate on virtual channel 41 in the United States:

 K06QR-D in Eugene, Oregon
 K14QT-D in Texarkana, Texas
 K16AZ-D in Glasgow, Montana
 K17FA-D in Willmar, Minnesota
 K17MX-D in Frost, Minnesota
 K22MN-D in Fort Peck, Montana
 K30QC-D in Ridgecrest, California
 K32NM-D in Des Moines, Iowa
 K32OI-D in Eureka, California
 K33ID-D in Ridgecrest, California
 K34AF-D in Alexandria, Minnesota
 K34MZ-D in Prosser, Washington
 K38KL-D in Ellesnburg, Washington
 K39FE-D in Willmar, Minnesota
 K41KX-D in Joplin, Missouri
 KBCA in Alexandria, Louisiana
 KBFY-LD in Fortuna, Arizona
 KCBB-LD in Boise, Idaho
 KCBZ-LD in Casper, Wyoming
 KCRP-CD in Corpus Christi, Texas
 KCYH-LD in Ardmore, Oklahoma
 KCYU-LD in Yakima, Washington
 KDBK-LD in Bakersfield, California
 KENH-LD in Hot Springs, Arkansas
 KEUS-LD in San Angelo, Texas
 KMYT-TV in Tulsa, Oklahoma
 KNOV-CD in New Orleans, Louisiana
 KOXO-CD in Portland, Oregon
 KPDF-CD in Phoenix, Arizona
 KPTO-LD in Pocatello, Idaho
 KPXM-TV in St. Cloud, Minnesota
 KRHT-LD in Redding, California
 KRMT in Denver, Colorado
 KSFZ-LD in Springfield, Missouri
 KSHB-TV in Kansas City, Missouri
 KTFF-LD in Fresno, California
 KTFQ-TV in Albuquerque, New Mexico
 KVER-CD in Indio, California
 KVMM-CD in Santa Barbara, California
 KWEX-DT in San Antonio, Texas
 KXDA-LD in Garland, Texas
 KXTS-LD in Victoria, Texas
 W15EG-D in Corning, New York
 W23EW-D in Springfield, Illinois
 W30EH-D in Fort Wayne, Indiana
 WBME-CD in Milwaukee, Wisconsin
 WDRB in Louisville, Kentucky
 WDUM-LD in Philadelphia, Pennsylvania
 WEKA-LD in Canton, Ohio
 WFRW-LD in Enterprise, Alabama
 WHEH-LD in Lumberton, North Carolina
 WHTJ in Charlottesville, Virginia
 WIIQ in Demopolis, Alabama
 WJAN-CD in Miami, Florida
 WMDF-LD in Miami, Florida
 WMGT-TV in Macon, Georgia
 WNCR-LD in Tarboro, North Carolina
 WOTV in Battle Creek, Michigan
 WUCB-LD in Cobleskill, New York
 WXTV-DT in Paterson, New Jersey

The following stations, which are no longer licensed, formerly operated on virtual channel 41 in the United States:
 K31PG-D in Granite Falls, Minnesota
 KLMW-LD in Lufkin, Texas
 KMMA-CD in San Luis Obispo, California
 KQLP-LD in Lincoln, Nebraska
 KTJX-LD in College Station, Texas
 W42DZ-D in Adjuntas, Puerto Rico
 WFDE-LD in Champaign, Illinois
 WOCH-CD in Chicago, Illinois
 WRZY-LD in Buxton, North Carolina
 WVTA in Windsor, Vermont

References

41 virtual